The cushioned gerbil (Gerbillus pulvinatus) is distributed mainly in Somalia, Ethiopia, Djibouti and Kenya.

References

Musser, G. G. and M. D. Carleton. 2005. Superfamily Muroidea. pp. 894–1531 in Mammal Species of the World a Taxonomic and Geographic Reference. D. E. Wilson and D. M. Reeder eds. Johns Hopkins University Press, Baltimore.
  Database entry includes a brief justification of why this species is of least concern

Gerbillus
Rodents of Africa
Mammals of Kenya
Mammals of Djibouti
Mammals of Ethiopia
Mammals of Somalia
Mammals described in 1896